Homs Governorate ( / ALA-LC: Muḥāfaẓat Ḥimṣ) is one of the fourteen governorates (provinces) of Syria. It is situated in central Syria. It is thus geographically the largest governorate of Syria. Homs Governorate has a population of 1,763,000 (2010 estimate). The Homs governorate is divided into 6 administrative districts (mantiqah), with the city of Homs as a separate district. Homs is the capital city of the district of Homs. Its governor is Namir Habib Makhlouf.

A Homs Governorate also formed part of Ottoman Syria, when it was also known as the Sanjak of Homs.

Districts 

The governorate is divided into seven districts (manatiq). The districts are further divided into 25 sub-districts (nawahi):

 Homs District (10 sub-districts)
 Homs Subdistrict
 Khirbet Tin Nur Subdistrict
 Ayn al-Niser Subdistrict
 Furqlus Subdistrict
 Al-Riqama Subdistrict
 Al-Qaryatayn Subdistrict
 Mahin Subdistrict
 Hisyah Subdistrict
 Sadad Subdistrict
 Shin Subdistrict
 Al-Mukharram District (2 sub-districts)
 al-Mukharram Subdistrict
 Jubb al-Jarrah Subdistrict
 Al-Rastan District (2 sub-districts)
 ar-Rastan Subdistrict
 Talbiseh Subdistrict

 Al-Qusayr District (2 sub-districts)
 Al-Qusayr Subdistrict
 Al-Hoz Subdistrict
 Tadmur District (2 sub-districts)
 Tadmur Subdistrict
 Al-Sukhnah Subdistrct
 Taldou District (3 sub-districts)*
 Taldou Subdistrict
 Kafr Laha Subdistrict
 Al-Qabu Subdistrict
 Talkalakh District (4 sub-districts)
 Talkalakh Subdistrict
 Hadidah Subdistrict
 Al-Nasirah Subdistrict
 Al-Hawash Subdistrict

* - a newly-created district since 2010, formerly belonging to Homs District

Demographics  
The Al-Mukharram District is predominantly inhabited by Alawites. The Taldou, Talkalakh, Homs and Al-Qusayr districts have a mixed Alawite, Sunni Muslim and Christian population. The Al-Qusayr District is also home to a large number of Shia Muslims.

See also 

 Homs offensive (November–December 2015)

References

External links
ehoms The First Complete website for Homs news and services

 
Governorates of Syria